The 2019–20 Liga II is the 7th season, since its reintroduction in 2013, of the second level women's football league of the Romanian football league system. The number of teams was reduced from 16 to 14. Therefore, 14 teams divided in 2 series were to play in the competition that consists of a double round-robin lasting 12 stages, totaling 84 matches. Since one team withdrew before the start of the competition, the total number of matches to be played became 72. However, only the first half of the season was played (36 games), until the season was frozen due to the 2019-20 coronavirus pandemic.

Team changes

To Liga II
Promoted from Liga III
 Carmen București (winners of 2018-19 Liga III, Seria I)
 CN Nicu Gane Fălticeni (winners of 2018-19 Liga III, Seria II)
 CSM Târgu Mureș (winners of 2018-19 Liga III, Seria III)
 ACS Atletic Drobeta-Turnu-Severin (runners-up of 2018-19 Liga III, Seria I)

From Liga II
Promoted to Liga I
 Selena SN Constanța (winners of 2018-19 Liga II, Seria I)
 Piroș Security Lioness Arad (winners of 2018-19 Liga II, Seria I)
 Luceafărul Filiași (winners of 2018-19 Liga II Promotion Play-off)

Relegated to Liga III
 Viitorul Reghin (4th place in the 2018-19 Liga II, Seria I decided to enroll in Liga III, Seria III)
 Măgura 2012 Bacău (8th place in the 2018-19 Liga II decided to enroll in Liga III, Seria IV)

Disbanded
 CS Ineu (8th place in 2017-18 Liga II, Seria I, disbanded at senior level)

Excluded and spared teams
Viitorul Reghin requested to be enrolled in Liga III for the 2019–20 season, so Măgura 2012 Bacău (8th place in 2018-19 Liga II, Seria I) could have been spared from relegation due to lack of teams. However, Măgura 2012 Bacău decided to play in Liga III anyway. Due to this vacated spot, ACS Atletic Drobeta-Turnu-Severin was promoted to Liga II.

Renamed teams
Sporting Lugaș changed its name to ACS United Bihor at the start of the 2018–19 season.

Stadiums by capacity and location

Seria I

Seria II

Seria I Season results

Seria I League table

Seria I Results

Seria II Season results

Seria II League table

Seria II Results

References

External links
 Official site

Rom
Fem
Women's football in Romania